SDPS can refer to:

S.D. Public School, Jagadhri
Social Democratic Party of Serbia (Socijaldemokratska partija Srbije), a political party in Serbia
Social Democratic Party "Harmony", a political party in Latvia
 Standard Dial-up POP3 Service, extensions to POP3 that allow multiple accounts per domain